Rahayu is an Indonesian and Malay surname and unisex given first name. Notable people with the name include:

Surname
Aries Susanti Rahayu (born 1995), Indonesian sport climbing athlete
Sri Dewi Rahayu (born 1994), Indonesian female weightlifter; see Indonesia at the 2014 Asian Para Games
Apriani Rahayu (born 1998), Indonesian female badminton player

Given name
Rahayu Mahzam (born 1980), Singaporean politician 
Rahayu Supanggah (born 1949), Indonesian composer
Amelia Rahayu Murray (born 1993), Indonesian-New Zealander female singer known as Fazerdaze
Endang Rahayu Sedyaningsih (1955–2012), Indonesian health minister from October 22, 2009 until April 30, 2012

Indonesian-language surnames
Surnames of Indonesian origin